This is a list of departure control system vendors.

Res2 (iPort DCS)
ABB Ltd
ACCELaero
Amadeus
Emerson Electric Co.
General Electric Co.
Hitit Computer Services
Honeywell International Inc.
Invensys
John Keells IT
Mitsubishi Heavy Industries
Siemens
SITA
Travel Technology Interactive
Yokogawa Electric Corporation

References 

Airport infrastructure